Elections to Rotherham Metropolitan Borough Council were held on 6 May 2021.

Although Labour retained control of the council, the Conservatives went from zero to 20 seats at this election.

Ward Results
Source:

Anston & Woodsetts

Aston & Todwick

Aughton & Swallownest

Boston Castle

Bramley & Ravenfield

Brinsworth

Dalton & Thrybergh

Dinnington

Greasbrough

Hellaby & Maltby West

Hoober

Keppel

Kilnhurst & Swinton East

Maltby East

Rawmarsh East

Rawmarsh West

Rother Vale

Rotherham East

Rotherham West

Sitwell

Swinton Rockingham

Thurcroft & Wickersley South

Wales

Wath

Wickersley North

By-elections

Anston & Woodsetts
A by-election was held on 9 December 2021 after the resignation of Cllr Emma McClure

Aughton & Swallownest
A by-election was held on 9 December 2021 after the resignation of Cllr Jack Austin

Keppel
A by-election was held on 27 January 2023 after the resignation of Cllr Paul Hague

References

Rotherham
Rotherham Council elections